Taylor McDowell "Dunc" Duncan (May 12, 1953 – January 3, 2004) was an American baseball infielder. Duncan, who was a college teammate of Leon Lee in Sacramento, was selected by the Atlanta Braves as the 10th overall pick of the 1971 Major League Baseball Draft. He was traded along with Earl Williams by the Braves to the Baltimore Orioles for Davey Johnson, Pat Dobson, Johnny Oates and Roric Harrison on the last day of the Winter Meetings on December 1, 1972. Duncan spent five seasons playing for Orioles-affiliated minor league clubs. In September 1977 he was claimed off waivers by the St. Louis Cardinals and made his major league debut, playing a handful of the remaining games. He changed teams again as the Oakland Athletics selected him in the Rule 5 draft on December 5, 1977. The 1978 season was Duncan's last in Major League Baseball: he appeared in 104 games of the 1978 season playing mostly third base. Duncan continued to play in the minor leagues until 1980. The obituary of The Sacramento Bee quoted a major league scout who believed that Duncan's career had been hampered by a broken ankle he suffered early in his minor league career.

References

External links

1953 births
2004 deaths
African-American baseball players
American expatriate baseball players in Canada
American expatriate baseball players in Japan
American expatriate baseball players in Mexico
Asheville Orioles players
Azules de Coatzacoalcos players
Baseball players from Memphis, Tennessee
Evansville Triplets players
Gold Coast Suns (baseball) players
Greenwood Braves players
Knoxville Blue Jays players
Leones de Yucatán players
Major League Baseball third basemen
Montgomery Rebels players
Nippon Professional Baseball third basemen
Oakland Athletics players
Petroleros de Poza Rica players
Portland Beavers players
Rochester Red Wings players
Seibu Lions players
St. Louis Cardinals players
St. Petersburg Pelicans players
Tacoma Tugs players
Tigres del México players
Vancouver Canadians players
Wytheville Braves players
20th-century African-American sportspeople
21st-century African-American people